The Seal of Neptune is a children's programme created by Oliver Postgate and Peter Firmin, also known for their works Ivor the Engine and Clangers. It was broadcast on BBC Television in 1960. Its plot featured the adventures of a seahorse and a shrimp and was similar in animation style to Ivor the Engine and Noggin the Nog.

It was followed in 1963 by a sequel called The Mermaid's Pearls.

In October 2010, the original film of the series was recovered from a disused pig sty on a farm belonging to Firmin.

In 2014, The Seal of Neptune and The Mermaid's Pearls (1963) were released on DVD by the Dragons Friendly Society.

References

External links 
 
 
 Dragons friendly society

1960 British television series debuts
1960s British children's television series
BBC children's television shows
British children's animated adventure television series
Television series by Smallfilms
British stop-motion animated television series
1960s British animated television series